EDISOFT – Software Services and Development Company, S.A. is a company of Thales Group that offers software development and engineering solutions, systems integration and technological consulting for critical systems in land, maritime, space or cyberspace for the defense and civil markets. Edisoft has currently partnerships with two portuguese shipbuilders, Arsenal do Alfeite and with West Sea Shipyard, the buider of Viana do Castelo-class patrol vessels.

This company currently carries out projects in several business areas:

 Defense and Security
 Space systems
 Air Systems
 Integrated business solutions
 Geographical based decision systems

Products

Naval Defense Systems  

 C4SEA;
 INIMIG;
 OceanEye;
 SAFEPORT;
 CYBER.

Air Systems 

 TOPSKY TOWER;
 TOPSKY AMHS;
 TOPSKY FLOW MANAGER;
 TOWER ONE;
 NAVAIDS.

Space Systems   

 ESA tracking Station;
 Earth Observation Station;
 Galileo Sensor Station (GSS);
Real Time Executive for Multiprocessor Systems' (RTEMS).

References 
Defence companies of Portugal

Aerospace companies of Portugal
Thales Group divisions and subsidiaries
Electronics companies of Portugal